The Broadway Bus Terminal is a major local and regional bus terminal in Paterson, New Jersey operated by New Jersey Transit.
It is located on Broadway between Memorial Drive and West Broadway in Downtown Paterson, putting it near  Passaic County Community College and a few blocks from Paterson City Hall and the Great Falls Historic District, including the Great Falls (Passaic River).

Facilities and service
New Jersey Transit bus operations, some operated by Community Coach, make use of the terminal, one of several origination points in the city and serves an average of 1600 buses each weekday. Buses depart from four sheltered bus lanes adjacent to the indoor waiting room. Indoor and outdoor facilities were  renovated and expanded in 2010. The terminal is served by the 72 (to Newark Penn Station), 74 (to Newark Subway, Branch Brook Park), 161 (to Port Authority Bus Terminal), 171 (to George Washington Bridge Bus Terminal), 190 (to Port Authority Bus Terminal), 703 (nights and weekends to Meadowlands Sports Complex), 746 (to Ridgewood), 748 (to Willowbrook Mall), and 770 (to Hackensack Bus Terminal). One of the William Paterson University campus shuttles also serves the terminal.

A ticket office is open daily (6 AM - 8 PM).

Paterson public transportation
Jitney service by  Spanish Transportation-owned minibuses (doing business as Express Service) travels from Paterson to locations in Passaic, Bergen, and Hudson counties as well as the Port Authority Bus Terminal and George Washington Bridge Bus Station in New York City. Dollar vans, locally known in Spanish as guaguas are also available in the vicinity traveling to Jersey City, North Hudson and 42nd Street (Manhattan). City Hall has many buses that stop at or near it, going to various points in neighboring communities, Manhattan and regional shopping centers. The Paterson NJT regional rail train station is located 10 blocks east of the bus terminal. The Passaic-Bergen Rail Line is a proposed rail line through the city which will make a stop nearby.

History
When constructed in the 1932 and before bustitution, the Public Service Railway operated trolleys from the terminal, namely the Line 1 (Edgewater), Line 5 (Suffern), and Line 15 to Hudson Place (Hoboken). The terminal has been renovated during the course of the years, the most recent refurbishment completed in 2010.

Paterson bus routes

References

External links
Unofficial New Jersey bus map
Paterson Jitney Bus information guide
NJ Transit route finder
NJT Bus Routes in Passaic County
NJT Bus Routes in Bergen County
NJT Bus Routes in Hudson County

Transportation in Paterson, New Jersey
NJ Transit bus stations
Transportation buildings and structures in Passaic County, New Jersey
Bus transportation in New Jersey
Transit hubs serving New Jersey
Buildings and structures in Paterson, New Jersey